Andimadam is a town in Tamil Nadu. It is one of the blocks in the Ariyalur district and Taluk (from 16-09-2016) in the Ariyalur district "Land Of Cement", Tamil Nadu, India. It has three State Highways running across.

Demographics 

As per the 2011 census, Andimadam had a total population of 6,165 with 3,107 males and 3,058 females.

Andimadam is located 50 km away from Ariyalur, the main city of the district. Andiamdam is situated 242 kilometers south of Chennai, 111 kilometers north-east of Tiruchirappalli, and 23 kilometers north-west of Gangai Konda Cholapuram.

Religion

There are several temples and a church. The ancient Lord Siva temple is located in the center of Andimadam.

References 

Villages in Ariyalur district